KSJT-FM (107.5 FM) is a radio station broadcasting a Spanish music format. Currently known as "K-107 La Grande", KSJT began in 1985 at a facility on Oakes St. in San Angelo and later moved studios to the current location, 209 W. Beuaregard. Licensed to San Angelo, Texas, United States, the station serves the San Angelo area.  The station is currently owned by La Unica Broadcasting Co.

References

External links
KSJT La Grande 107.5 Facebook

SJT-FM